Robert Charles Dawson (February 4, 1932 – December 10, 2017) was an award-winning and Grey Cup champion former Canadian Football League player.

Dawson was a standout junior player with the Windsor AKO Fratmen team, winners of the 1952 national junior championship (the "Little Grey Cup") in a 15–12 victory over the Edmonton Wildcats. Several CFL teams were bidding for his services, but he chose the Hamilton Tiger-Cats, with whom he'd have a 7-season career. In his first season, he won the Gruen Trophy as best rookie in the east (no stats were kept, and only Canadians qualified for the award) and won the Grey Cup championship. He also won the Grey Cup in 1957.

Primarily a defensive back, he made five interceptions in his career, and he could substitute on offense, catching 11 passes in 1956. He could also play quarterback, and in 1956 he got the chance, which was a rarity, as very few Canadians got to play quarterback during this era. On October 20, 1956 the Cats were suffering a record setting defeat to the Montreal Alouettes, 82–14, when coach Jim Trimble replaced starting quarterback Tony Curcillo. Dawson came on and completed five of eight passes for one touchdown.

Dawson was enshrined in the Windsor/Essex County Sports Hall of Fame in 2001. He died on December 10, 2017 at the age of 85.

References

1932 births
2017 deaths
Hamilton Tiger-Cats players
Canadian Football League Rookie of the Year Award winners
Sportspeople from Bradenton, Florida
Sportspeople from Windsor, Ontario
Players of Canadian football from Ontario